Events from the year 2006 in Indonesia

Incumbents

Events
 Museum Pasifika is founded. 
 March 27: Newspaper Rakyat Merdeka publishes a cartoon depicting the Australian prime minister and foreign minister as copulating dingoes in response to the West Papuan refugee crisis 
 May: Sidoarjo mud flow 
 May 27: 2006 Yogyakarta earthquake 
 July 17: 2006 Pangandaran earthquake and tsunami 
 October 8: 2006 Southeast Asian haze 
 November 6 – 9: The Yogyakarta Principles are developed and signed. 
 December 11: Acehnese gubernatorial election, 2006

Sport
 2006 Indonesia national football team results
 2006 Copa Indonesia final
 2006 Liga Indonesia Premier Division
 2006 Indonesia Open
 Indonesia at the 2006 Asian Games 

 
Indonesia